Juuru is a small borough in Rapla Parish, Rapla County, Estonia. From 1991 until 2017 (until the administrative reform of Estonian local governments), Juuru was the administrative center of Juuru Parish.

Gallery

References

External links
Juuru Parish 

Boroughs and small boroughs in Estonia
Kreis Harrien